Karl Widemann or Carl Widemann or Carolus Widemann, was a German author, physician and collector of manuscripts, from Augsburg, and secretary of the English alchemist Edward Kelley, at the court of Emperor Rudolph II.

Life
Between 1587 and 1588, Widemann worked in Prague for Edward Kelly at the court of Emperor Rudolph II. Widemann also worked in Třeboň for the Rožmberks, also known as the Rosenberg family.
Karl Widemann is known for copying and collecting over 30 years the works from Paracelsus. Because of this many unpublished works from Paracelsus survived to the present day. He did the same for the works of Caspar Schwenckfeld, and Widemann's close colleagues Valentin Krautwald and Adam Reissner. After Helisaeus Roeslin's (Helisäus Röslin) death in 1616, his unpublished astrology, theology and kabbalistic work merged into the manuscript collection of Karl Widemann. Adam Haslmayr a close friend of Widemann, wrote him a letter about Rosicrucian people who revealed the Theophrastiam, on December 24, 1611.

Voynich manuscript

In March 1599 Emperor Rudolph II bought books from Karl Widemann for 500 Taler. However, these books were not catalogued in Rudolph's Kunstkammer inventory.

Works
Interpraetatio Mystica et Vera in Quartum librum Esdrae Prophetae - 1619
Paracelsi Testamentum

References

16th-century births
16th-century German physicians
17th-century German physicians
16th-century German writers
16th-century German male writers
17th-century German writers
17th-century German male writers
Year of death unknown